North Mundham is a village and civil parish in the Chichester district of West Sussex, England. It lies on the B2166 road two miles (3.2 km) southeast of Chichester.

Etymology

The earliest known appearance of the name is se northra Mundan ham, which is listed as appurtenant in a charter from AD 680 by which Cædwalla of Wessex gave Pagham to Wilfrid. Mund is the nominative plural of the Old English word munda, meaning "protector" or "guardian." The suffix -ham is the Old English noun meaning "homestead, village, manor or estate." The suffix -hamm is the Old English for enclosure, land hemmed by water or marsh or higher ground, land in a riverbend, river­meadow or promontory". Both appear as -ham in modern place-names.

History
Mundham (not distinguishing between North Mundham and South Mundham) was listed in the Domesday Book of 1086 in the Hundred of Stockbridge as having 30 households, plough lands, church and mills, and a value of 8 pounds.

Governance
An electoral ward in the same name exists. This ward includes Oving with a total ward population taken at the 2011 census of 2,252.

References

External links

Villages in West Sussex
Chichester District